Navotas Island is an island in the city of Navotas, Philippines. Situated in the Tullahan River delta, it is surrounded on the west by Manila Bay, on the north by the Tangos River, on the east by the Navotas River, and on the south by the Tullahan River. The city center or poblacion of Navotas is located on the island. With an estimated land area of 1.95 km2, makes Navotas Island, one of the most densest islands in the world.

Barangays
Nine out of the eighteen barangays of the city are located in the island. They are namely;
 Bagumbayan North
 Bagumbayan South
 Daanghari
 Navotas East
 Navotas West
 San Jose (Poblacion)
 San Roque
 Sipac-Almacen
 Tangos North
 Tangos South

Geography
The island is located at the mouth of the Tullahan River delta, in the northwest of Metro Manila. Bridges connect the island to the rest of city of Navotas in the south and to the city of Malabon in the east.

Demographics
The total population of Navotas Island is 117,196.

As of 2020, below is the total population of the barangays of Navotas Island.

Transport

There are jeepney routes going to Navotas from nearby cities, Malabon, Caloocan and Manila. Also, direct bus lines to Navotas from several cities in Mega Manila, such as Parañaque, Taguig, Muntinlupa, Makati, Dasmariñas, Cavite and San Pedro, Laguna.

Boat trips are also available from Malabon and Barangay Tanza to Navotas.

Gallery

See also
 List of islands by population density
 List of islands in the Greater Manila Area
 River island

References

Islands of the Philippines
Islands of Metro Manila